Szczawa  is a village in the administrative district of Gmina Kamienica, within Limanowa County, Lesser Poland Voivodeship, in southern Poland.

The village has a population of 2,100. Szczawa is a recreational village and winter sports destination located in the valley of Gorce Mountains beneath the Gorce National Park.

References

Villages in Limanowa County